Ravnište may refer to:

 Ravnište (Brus), a village in Serbia
 Ravnište (Kučevo), a village in Serbia